Wystruć may refer to:

 Wystruć, the Polish name for the Instruch River flowing through the Kaliningrad Oblast
 Wystruć, the Polish name for the town of Chernyakhovsk (formerly Insterburg)